Robert Klas-Göran Prytz (born 12 January 1960) is a Swedish former professional footballer who played as a midfielder from the late 1970s until the early 2000s. He earned 56 caps for the Swedish national team and is best known for his time at Hellas Verona, Malmö FF and Rangers.

He was the 1986 recipient of Guldbollen as Sweden's best footballer of the year.

Career 

Robert Klas-Göran Prytz was born 1960 in Malmö and grew up with four brothers and three sisters in a working class neighbourhood called Kirseberg.

He started playing for his local team Kirsebergs IF before moving up to Malmö FF as a 16-year old.
Under the successful English manager Bob Houghton Prytz flourished and although it was because of injuries he got the chance of a lifetime when he in 1979 as a 19 year old played in the European Cup Final vs Nottingham Forest in Munich.
A game that Nottingham won 1-0.
The year after he made his international debut for Sweden.

In 1982 Robert spent 3 months at Stoke City and was meant to sign for them, but work permit rules meant that the move didn't happen.
Back home he got a call from an agent saying that there was another team in the UK interrested in him: Glasgow Rangers. 
Robert Prytz was only the second Swedish player for Rangers after Örjan Persson that played in the club 1967-70.

In his first season in Scotland: 1982-83 
Robert Prytz scored his first goal for the club vs Clydebank away in the League Cup in August, with Rangers winning 4-1.

He also made a good inpact in his league debut away vs Motherwell scoring in a 2-2 draw. Prytz scored the 2-1 winner away to Aberdeen 3 weeks later and he scored a spectacular goal away to Celtic in October, a corner kick that went straight in goal.

His first season at Rangers saw him play 48 games (30 in the league) scoring 7 times (5 in the league) 
Rangers finishing only 4th in the league witch saw Dundee United winning.
Rangers did reach both the Scottish Cup and League Cup finals but lost them both.

The 1983-84 season started the same way as the previous with Prytz scoring on the opening day of the season, 
a penalty earning a 1-1 draw at home against St Mirren. But after a terrible start to the season with Rangers losing 7 of the following 10 games manager John Greig was replaced by legendary manager Jock Wallace. Rangers did lose the following game but then went on a 22 match unbeaten run, 
but Rangers eventually finished 4th yet again. Aberdeen led by a former Rangers player called Alex Ferguson winning the league. Rangers did however win 2 trophies that season 
beating Celtic both in the Glasgow Cup final 1-0 
as well as winning a thrilling League Cup final 
3-2 after extra time, with Ally McCoist scoring a hattrick.

Robert Prytz's appearances for the season was 42 games (26 in the league) scoring 9 goals (4 in the league).

The season 1984-85 finished almost identically as the previous season with Aberdeen winning the league and Rangers finnishing 4th. Rangers won both the League Cup and Glasgow Cup the second season in a row.

Prytz made 28 appearances (21 in the league) scoring 4 goals (3 in the league).
His Rangers career saw him play 118 games (72 in the league) scoring 20 goals (12 in the league) in 3 seasons.

It became obvious though that Prytz's technical style of playing the ball on the ground didn't always fit the style that british clubs played at that time and it was time to move on.

He joined IFK Gothenburg for a breaf spell in the summer and then moved on to Young Boys in Switzerland where he became an instant success, winning the league that year.

Robert Prytz also represented 
Bayer Uerdingen, Atalanta, Hellas Verona, Malmö FF and Young Boys again before 1996 moving back "home" to Scotland
He did keep his house in Glasgow the whole time since he met and married the Scottish Joyce, and had 2 daughters.

Prytz continued playing for various Scottish clubs for another 5 seasons,
including Kilmarnock, Dumbarton, Cowdenbeath, East Fife, Pollok and Hamilton Accies before hanging up his boots in 2001.

After living in Glasgow for 26 years a divorce and the ability to be closer to his aging mother Prytz moved back to Sweden in 2008, and he did get to spend two years with his mother before she passed away. He now lives and works in Malmö, all his earnings as a professional football player went to securing the future for his ex-wife and now adult daughters.

During his career Robert Prytz won 2 league titles with Young Boys and Malmö FF.
He also won the Swedish Cup with Malmö FF, the Swiss Cup with Young Boys and of course 2 League Cups and 2 Glasgow Cups with Rangers FC.

He also won the Guldbollen = player of the year award in Sweden in 1986.

He was capped 56 times for Sweden, scoring 13 goals.

He still continues to play football on a more modest level, playing in friendlies for a team consisting of celebrities and former players.

Career statistics

International 

 Scores and results list Sweden's goal tally first, score column indicates score after each Prytz goal.

Honours
Malmö
Allsvenskan: 1977
Svenska Cupen: 1979–80
European Cup Runner-up: 1978–79

Rangers
Scottish League Cup: 1983–84, 1984–85

Young Boys
Swiss League: 1985–86
Swiss Cup: 1986–87
Swiss Super Cup: 1986

Pollok
Central Sectional League Cup: 1999 - 2000
West of Scotland Junior Cup: 1999 - 2000

Individual

 Stor Grabb: 1984
 Guldbollen: 1986
 Swiss Foreign Footballer of the Year: 1986–87

References

External links
 

Living people
1960 births
Swedish footballers
Footballers from Skåne County
Sweden international footballers
Malmö FF players
Rangers F.C. players
IFK Göteborg players
BSC Young Boys players
KFC Uerdingen 05 players
Atalanta B.C. players
Hellas Verona F.C. players
Kilmarnock F.C. players
Dumbarton F.C. players
Cowdenbeath F.C. players
East Fife F.C. players
Pollok F.C. players
Hamilton Academical F.C. players
Allsvenskan players
Bundesliga players
Serie A players
Serie B players
Scottish Football League players
Swiss Super League players
Expatriate footballers in Switzerland
Expatriate footballers in Germany
Expatriate footballers in Italy
Expatriate footballers in Scotland
Swedish expatriate footballers
Swedish expatriate sportspeople in Germany
Swedish expatriate sportspeople in Italy
Swedish expatriate sportspeople in Scotland
Swedish expatriate sportspeople in Switzerland
Association football midfielders